The general election was held in the U.S. state of Arizona on November 8, 2016, as part of the 2016 General Election. Arizona voters chose 11 electors to represent them in the Electoral College via a popular vote.
Also three seats on the Arizona Corporation Commission were up for election, as well as all of Arizona's nine seats in the United States House of Representatives and one seat for the United States Senate. Primary elections were held in August 2016.

US President

Corporation Commission
Three seats on the Arizona Corporation Commission were up for election. Republican Brenda Burns chose not to run for re-election to a second term in office. Republican Gary Pierce was term-limited and ineligible to run for re-election to a third term in office.

Republican primary

Candidates
 Robert Burns, incumbent
 Al Melvin, former state senator
 Rick Gray, state representative
 Andy Tobin, incumbent
 Boyd Dunn, former mayor of Chandler, Arizona

Results

Democratic primary
Because only 2 Democratic candidates ran for the Corporation Commission, no Democratic primary was held.

Candidates
 Tom Chabin, former Coconino County supervisor and legislator.
 William Mundell, former Republican lawmaker and commissioner.

General election

Results

US Senate

Republican incumbent John McCain defeated Democrat Ann Kirkpatrick.

House of Representatives

All of Arizona's nine seats in the United States House of Representatives were up for election in 2016.  Republicans won 5 seats, while Democrats took 4.

References

 
Arizona